The Honoured Dead Memorial is a provincial heritage site in Kimberley in the Northern Cape province of South Africa. It is situated at the meeting point of five roads, and commemorates those who died defending the city during the Siege of Kimberley in the Anglo-Boer War.

In 1986, it was described in the Government Gazette as

Rhodes sent Baker to Greece to study ancient memorials - the Nereid Monument at Xanthus greatly influenced his design.

The monument is built of sandstone quarried in the Matopo Hills in Zimbabwe and is the tomb of 27 soldiers. It features an inscription that Rhodes specifically commissioned Rudyard Kipling to write.

The Long Cecil gun that was designed and manufactured by George Labram in the workshops of De Beers during the siege is mounted on its stylobate (facing the Free State).  It is surrounded by shells from the Boer Long Tom.  The memorial was dedicated on 28 November 1904. It was vandalised in 2010 when brass fittings were broken off parts of the gun.

References
 South African Heritage Resource Agency database

External links
3D Google model by Jacapp
Panoramio photo of the Honoured Dead Memorial

Buildings and structures in Kimberley, Northern Cape
Second Boer War memorials
Herbert Baker buildings and structures